Trib Publications is a regional newspaper chain based in Manchester, Georgia, United States.

Trib Publications was started by Robert Tribble in 1968.  Tribble, previously the editor of the local weekly newspaper Manchester Mercury, bought three small weeklies, the Harris County Journal, Meriwether Vindicator and Talbotton New Era with a total circulation of 3,500. In 1976 he bought his former paper, by then called the Manchester Star-Mercury.  By 1984 he had 15 papers, which grew to 30 by 1995.  Some of Trib's earliest Georgia acquisitions were sold in 1999 to another small paper aggregator, Millard B. Grimes of Athens, Georgia's Grimes Publications.  Trib re-acquired these properties from Grimes in 2011.

Among Trib's other papers is The Western Star, a weekly in Bessemer, Alabama. The Star was established in 1984,Ulrich's International Periodicals Directory, Volume 5, p. 9939 (1999) but its predecessor titles go back to 1887 (Bessemer Advertiser 1949-1990, Tribune-Advertiser 1930-1949, Bessemer Advertiser 1920-1930, Bessemer Weekly 1889-1920, The Bessemer 1887-1889).  As of 1995, its circulation was 9,500, at that time the largest circulation among Trib's papers; the circulation has since dropped to less than 3,000. The Star'''s offices in Charleston House are on the National Register of Historic Places as part of the Downtown Bessemer Historic District.

Trib has continued to acquire new properties, buying the Houston Home Journal'' of Perry, Georgia in 2014.

Among Trib Publications' properties are:
 The Centreville Press in Centreville, Alabama
 The Marion Times-Standard in Marion, Alabama
 The Western Star in Bessemer, Alabama
 The Adel News Tribune in Adel, Georgia
 The Berrien Press in Nashville, Georgia
 The Camilla Enterprise in Camilla, Georgia
 The Citizen-Georgian in Montezuma, Georgia
 The Fayette County News in Fayetteville, Georgia
 The Harris County Journal in Hamilton, Georgia
 The Hogansville Herald in Hogansville, Georgia
 The Houston Home Journal in Perry, Georgia
 The Lanier County News in Lakeland, Georgia
 The Leader Tribune in Fort Valley, Georgia
 The Manchester Star-Mercury in Manchester, Georgia
 The Meriwether Vindicator in Greenville, Georgia
 The News Observer in Vienna, Georgia
 The Plus in Sandersville, Georgia.
 The Quitman Free Press in Quitman, Georgia
 The Sandersville Progress in Sandersville, Georgia
 The Sparta Ishmaelite in Sparta, Georgia
 The Talbotton New Era in Talbotton, Georgia
 The Today in Peachtree City in Fayetteville, Georgia
 The Wiregrass Farmer in Ashburn, Georgia
 The Wrightsville Headlight in Wrightsville, Georgia
 The Polk County News Journal in Columbus, North Carolina
 The Yancey Common Times Journal in Burnsville, North Carolina
 The Advertizer-Herald in Bamberg, South Carolina
 The Holly Hill Observer in Holly Hill, South Carolina
 The Keowee Courier in Walhalla, South Carolina
 The Lake Community Buyer's Guide in Santee, South Carolina
 The Landrum News Leader in Landrum, South Carolina
 The Santee Striper in Santee, South Carolina
 The Westminster News in Westminster, South Carolina

References

Newspaper companies of the United States
Companies based in Meriwether County, Georgia
1968 establishments in Georgia (U.S. state)